Woody Creek is an unincorporated town, a post office, and a census-designated place (CDP) located in and governed by Pitkin County, Colorado, United States. The Woody Creek post office has the ZIP Code 81656 (post office boxes). At the United States Census 2010, the population of the Woody Creek CDP was 263, while the population of the 81656 ZIP Code Tabulation Area was 242. The Woody Creek Metropolitan District provides services. The CDP is a part of the Glenwood Springs, CO Micropolitan Statistical Area.

Geography
Woody Creek is situated in the valley of the Roaring Fork River northwest of Aspen, along State Highway 82, where Woody Creek exits a canyon and joins the Roaring Fork.  It is situated at the northwest (and least developed) end of a small valley that stretches southeast along the Roaring Fork to Aspen.

Demographics

Cityscape

The community is centered on a log cabin built in the 1940s by the Lee Jones family, which now houses the Woody Creek Tavern, a well-known landmark, as well as the Woody Creek Community Center. The cabin sits along a county road, somewhat concealed from State Highway 82. Adjacent is a trailer park and several homes, ranging from modest older ones to newer upscale structures.  Patrons of the Woody Creek Tavern or the Woody Creek Community Center can request a postcard which comes with postage for USA delivery, which can be scrawled upon and dropped off at the nearby post office.

Culture
Woody Creek was the residence of noted author Hunter S. Thompson for much of his life and at the time of his death. It also has been the home of several other celebrities and musicians including the late broadcaster Ed Bradley, Don Henley of the Eagles, John Oates (Hall and Oates), Jimmy Ibbotson of The Nitty Gritty Dirt Band and actor Don Johnson. Currently, Speaker of the U.S. House of Representatives Nancy Pelosi has a winter home in Woody Creek.

Updates on Woody Creek are often heard on local radio stations KNDH and KSNO.  The public radio stations available are KAJX, KDNK and KVOD.

Woody Creek was the residence of many of the founding members of the Aspen Ridiculous Theatre Company (ART-C).  ART-C is notable for its annual Winterskol show and spring extravaganzas at the Wheeler Opera House.

Gallery

See also

Colorado
Outline of Colorado
Index of Colorado-related articles
Bibliography of Colorado
Geography of Colorado
History of Colorado
Colorado statistical areas
Glenwood Springs, CO Micropolitan Statistical Area
List of counties in Colorado
Pitkin County, Colorado
List of places in Colorado
List of census-designated places in Colorado
List of forts in Colorado
List of ghost towns in Colorado
List of mountain passes in Colorado
List of mountain peaks of Colorado
List of municipalities in Colorado
List of post offices in Colorado
Protected areas of Colorado

References

External links

Woody Creek @ UncoverColorado.com
Woody Creek @ MySpace.com
Woody Creek Tavern
Pitkin County website

Census-designated places in Pitkin County, Colorado
Census-designated places in Colorado
Roaring Fork Valley